The lands administrative divisions of South Australia are the cadastral (i.e., comprehensively surveyed and mapped) units of counties and hundreds in South Australia. They are located only in the south-eastern part of the state, and do not cover the whole state. 49 counties have been proclaimed across the southern and southeastern areas of the state historically considered to be arable and thus in need of a cadastre. Within that area, a total of 540 hundreds have been proclaimed, although five were annulled in 1870, and, in some cases, the names reused elsewhere.

All South Australian hundreds have unique names, making it unnecessary, when referring to a hundred, to also name its county (as is done in some land administration systems such as that of New South Wales).

With the exception of the historic Hundred of Murray (1853–1870), which occupied parts of five counties, all hundreds have been defined as a subset of a single county.

The hundreds of South Australia formed the basis for the establishment boundaries of most of the earliest local government bodies (that is, district councils). By the 1930s most of the settled hundreds in the state had their own district councils. In the case of heavily settled lands, like the hundreds of Adelaide and Yatala, multiple town and city councils shared the governance of a single hundred. In the case of sparsely populated rural lands, adjacent hundreds were represented by a single district council. In every case, the hundred boundaries largely shaped the initial boundaries of such district councils, as seen with the large-scale expansion of South Australian local government in the District Councils Act 1887.

Land division history
In the early days of European settlement in South Australia, land was released in the colony for farming in an orderly manner by the government. Initial land sales were made as a prerequisite to the founding of the colony, with "preliminary land orders" being made to a total value of £35,000 prior to the 1837 settlement. A preliminary land order entitled the buyer to a  town block and an  section of rural land which was to be chosen by the individual following the earliest land survey after settlement. The initial town survey of Adelaide was completed in March 1837. By February 1839 the surrounding country from coast to foothills, as far south as O'Halloran Hill and north to present-day Grand Junction Road, had been surveyed into country sections, with between a quarter and a half having already been claimed by the early investors or purchased by early settlers.

The country sections delineated in the early land surveys generally formed the hundred sections when the first hundreds were proclaimed in 1846 (in the counties of Adelaide and Hindmarsh). From this time, the government surveyor systematically established new areas to be released by creating the boundaries of a county, and then dividing that into hundreds of approximately the same size. Outside the initial survey area centred on Adelaide, hundreds were surveyed into sections of varying sizes with the intention that the section would support a single viable farm. These sections were available for purchase soon after a hundred was surveyed and proclaimed. Most hundreds had a town near the middle, and smaller sections closer to the township. Contemporary definitions of rural real estate in South Australia still typically includes the section number(s) and hundred name.

A total of 540 hundreds were proclaimed in the state from 1846 to 1971, but only 535 exist today, following the discontinuation of the hundreds of Murray, Cooper, Randell, Giles and Morphett alongside the Murray River in 1870. A total of 561 names of hundreds are listed in the South Australian official gazetteer Placenames Online, with the 21 extra names unused today due to either renaming or failure to adopt proposed names.

Removal of German-origin names

In 1916, during the First World War, ten hundreds with names of German origin (Basedow, Homburg, Krichauff, North Rhine, Paech, Pflaum, Scherk, Schomburgk, South Rhine, Von Doussa) were proposed for renaming with Aboriginal names, but this only occurred for the hundreds of Paech and Pflaum which became the hundreds of Cannawigara and Geegeela, respectively. The remaining eight hundreds were renamed in 1918 with names derived from Allied commanders or battles. The hundreds of Basedow, Homburg, Krichauff, North Rhine, Scherk, Schomburgk, South Rhine and Von Doussa became, respectively, the hundreds of French, Haig, Beatty, Jellicoe, Sturdee, Maude, Jutland and Allenby.

List of counties

List of hundreds

References

Land administration divisions of South Australia
Cadastral divisions
Lists of subdivisions of Australia